Universal Circulating Music Library was a music publishers' activity established in the United Kingdom in the 1850s and 1860s. By the 1920s no significant such circulating libraries by music publishers survived, most probably due to reduced demand (the interested public would just buy the music they were interested in). In terms of the housed collections/music in such "libraries" run by publishers, it is probably fair to say that most was lost, with only some still being in music publisher's archives.

Messrs. Schuermann & Co.
Messrs. Schuermann & Co. were probably the first music publisher in the United Kingdom to start a Universal Circulating Music Library in 1855. An announcement at the time stated: 
'Many of our readers will be glad to have their attention directed towards the very comprehensive Music Library which has been formed by Messrs. Schuermann & Co., of 72, Newgate-street. The catalogue contains more than 42,042 separately numbered works, embracing almost every English and Foreign publication, under various headings and subdivisions.

Libraries of reference are of such absolute necessity to all students, especially to the musician, that several attempts have been made to satisfy the want; but most of these labor under the serious disadvantage of being confined to either one class of musical works, or—as in the case of the British Museum—of being available only to those who can go from home to study.

Messrs. Schuermann’s arrangements allow of a very liberal supply of works at the subscriber’s private residence, And the small annual cost would be well bestowed even by those who ultimately intend to purchase a private library for their own use, because it affords so complete an opportunity of examining the merits of a work previously to purchase. A very handsomely printed catalogue may be purchased at small cost; its perusal will fully prove the great outlay at which the proprietors have got together this collection.'

Novello, Ewer & Co.
The Universal Circulating Music Library provided by Novello, Ewer & Co. dates back to 1867/68. The preface of the first catalogue states:
The Universal Circulating Music Library:
This Library, which was established, and has been most successfully carried on since 1859, by Messrs. Ewer and Co., has been purchased by Messr. Novello and Co., and will be continued by them under the style of Novello, Ewer and Co.
In addition to the works named in the Library Catalogue, the whole of the publications of Messr. Novello, Ewer and Co. will be available to Subscribers; and neither expense nor exertion will be spared to make the Library still more complete.
A Supplement is now added to the present Catalogue, which makes the collection the largest and most valuable ever offered to the public. All New Music (Foreign or English) of merit will be added to the Library as soon as published, and every endeavour will be made to supply the wants of Subscribers immediately on application.
August, 1867.

The terms of subscription and the regulations of use are given on the next page.

Notes

Further reading
 William C. Smith, 'Music Publishing in the British Isles from the Beginnings until the Middle of the Nineteenth Century', 2nd edn., Oxford: Basil Blackwell, 1970.
 Alec Hyatt King  'Music Circulating Libraries in Britain', in 'The Musical Times', Vol. 119, No. 1620 (Feb., 1978), pp. 134–138.
 John A. Parkinson, 'Victorian Music Publishers: An Annotated List' (Detroit Studies in Music Bibliography, 64) Warren, Mich.: 1990.

Music publishing
Music libraries
Music organisations based in the United Kingdom